Joseph Root may refer to:

 Joseph M. Root (1807–1879), U.S. Representative from Ohio
 Joseph Pomeroy Root (1826–1885), American doctor, politician, and leader of the Kansas Free Staters
 Joseph Cullen Root, founder of Modern Woodmen of America
 Joe Root (born 1990), English cricketer
 Joe Root (Pennsylvania hermit) (1860–1912), hermit in Pennsylvania